Strange New Past is the second studio album by Australian musician Seth Sentry. Released in June 2015, the album peaked at number 2 on the ARIA Charts.

At the ARIA Music Awards of 2015 it won the ARIA Award for Best Urban Album.

Reception
Jonty Simmons from Beat Magazine called the album "..a mature successor" to Sentry's 2012 debut This Was Tomorrow saying "In 'Violin', Sentry pours out his heart and soul for his absentee mother. It's an album highlight that epitomises the changes Sentry has gone through during his journey to success. With his trademark cheek finally applied to something other than shying away from responsibility, Strange New Past is a huge step forward for Seth Sentry.

Track listing

Charts

Weekly charts

Year-end charts

References

2015 albums
Seth Sentry albums
ARIA Award-winning albums